The United States District Court for the Southern District of Florida (in case citations, S.D. Fla. or S.D. Fl.) is the federal United States district court with territorial jurisdiction over the southern part of the state of Florida.

Appeals from cases brought in the Southern District of Florida are to the United States Court of Appeals for the Eleventh Circuit (except for patent claims and claims against the U.S. government under the Tucker Act, which are appealed to the Federal Circuit).

History 

On the same day that Florida was admitted as a state, March 3, 1845, Congress enacted legislation creating the United States District Court for the District of Florida, . The statute effecting this division set forth the boundaries of the Districts:

[T]hat part of the State of Florida lying south of a line drawn due east and west from the northern point of Charlotte Harbor, including the islands, keys, reefs, shoals, harbors, bays and inlets, south of said line, shall be erected into a new judicial district, to be called the Southern District of Florida; a District Court shall be held in said Southern District, to consist of one judge, who shall reside at Key West, in said district...

This federal district has the dubious distinction of having had more judges removed through impeachment than any other district, with a total of two, one fourth of all federal judges so removed.

Famous cases that have been heard in the district include Bush v. Gore, United States v. Noriega (the prosecution of former Panamanian military leader Manuel Noriega), González v. Reno (the Elián González case), notorious Ponzi schemer Scott Rothstein, and United States v. José Padilla (the prosecution of José Padilla).

Jurisdiction 

The court's jurisdiction comprises the nine counties of Broward, Highlands, Indian River, Martin, Miami-Dade, Monroe, Okeechobee, Palm Beach, and St. Lucie. The district includes the South Florida metropolitan area of Miami, Fort Lauderdale, and West Palm Beach. It comprises  and approximately 6.3 million people. Courthouses, corresponding to the five divisions of the district, are located in Fort Lauderdale, Fort Pierce, Key West, Miami, and West Palm Beach. The court's offices are located in Miami.

United States attorney and the United States marshal 

The United States attorney for the Southern District of Florida represents the United States in civil and criminal litigation in the court. , the United States attorney is Markenzy Lapointe.

The United States Attorney's office has a staff of approximately 233 assistant United States attorneys and 227 support personnel. The main office is located in Miami, Florida, with three staffed branch offices located in Fort Lauderdale, West Palm Beach and Fort Pierce and one unstaffed branch office located in Key West. There is also a High Intensity Drug Trafficking Area (HIDTA) office in West Miami-Dade and a Health Care Fraud Facility in Miramar.

On August 28, 2018, Gadyaces S. Serralta was confirmed by the United States Senate to be the United States Marshal.

Current judges 
:

Vacancies and pending nominations

Former judges

Chief judges

Succession of seats

See also 
 Courts of Florida
 List of current United States district judges
 List of United States federal courthouses in Florida
 United States Court of Appeals for the Eleventh Circuit
 United States District Court for the Middle District of Florida
 United States District Court for the Northern District of Florida

References

External links 
 United States District Court for the Southern District of Florida official website
 Southern District of Florida Blog – By attorney David Markus

Florida, Southern District
Florida law
Miami
1847 establishments in Florida
Courthouses in Florida
Fort Lauderdale, Florida
West Palm Beach, Florida
Courts and tribunals established in 1847